Tihomir (Bulgarian, Macedonian and ) is a South Slavic male given name which means "quiet" and "peace" (South Slavic: Tiho = quiet, mir = peace). In Russian however the word “mir”  мир also means world. So in Russian language, the name means “Tiho” = quiet “mir” = peace or world) It may refer to:

Royalty and nobility
 Tihomir of Belegezitai (7th century), leader of the Belegezites
 Tihomir of Rascia (fl. 960), Serbian nobleman
 Tihomir (Teichomir) (fl. 1040), Bulgarian military commander and rebel
 Tihomir Zavidović (d. 1171), Grand Prince of Serbia ca. 1163-1171
 Tihomir (Thocomerius) (fl. 1278), Wallachian nobleman

Contemporary people
Tihomir Arsić, Serbian actor
Tihomir Blaškić, Bosnian Croat army officer
Tihomir Dovramadjiev, Bulgarian chess player and chess boxer.
Tihomir Franković, Croatian rower 
Tihomir Novakov, American physicist of Serbian descent
Tihomir Ognjanov, Serbian footballer who was part of Yugoslavia national football team
Tihomir Trifonov, Bulgarian footballer currently playing for PFC Montana as a defender 
Tihomir Orešković, Croatian former prime minister
Tihomir Ivanov, Bulgarian high jumper 
Tihomir Kanev, Bulgarian footballer 
Tihomir Kamenov, Bulgarian judge and jurist 
Tihomir Grozdanov, Bulgarian tennis player

Places
 Tihomir (village), Bulgaria

See also

External links
 http://www.behindthename.com/name/tihomir

Slavic masculine given names
Bulgarian masculine given names
Croatian masculine given names
Macedonian masculine given names
Montenegrin masculine given names
Slovene masculine given names
Serbian masculine given names